Norrbyvret is a village in Botkyrka Municipality, Stockholm County, southeastern Sweden. According to the 2005 census it had a population of 75 people.

References

Populated places in Botkyrka Municipality
Södermanland